Moeran is a surname. Notable people with the surname include:

 Ernest John Moeran (1894–1950), English composer
 Edward Moeran (1903–1997), British politician

See also
 Moran (surname)